Streptomyces ovatisporus is a Gram-positive bacterium species from the genus of Streptomyces which has been isolated from marine sediments from the coast of the Black Sea in Turkey.

See also 
 List of Streptomyces species

References 

 

ovatisporus
Bacteria described in 2016